The Dissection and Reconstruction of Music From the Past as Performed by the Inmates of Lalo Schifrin's Demented Ensemble as a Tribute to the Memory of the Marquis De Sade is a 1966 studio album by Lalo Schifrin.

Reception
The AllMusic review by Richard S. Ginell awarded the album three stars and said that "This crackpot title...is a front for a not-so-dangerous, hard-swinging album in which Schifrin invents or borrows 18th-century classical themes and sets them into big band or small-combo contexts. With the cream of New York's jazz session men of the '60s on board...jazz buffs will have a fine time with this collision of the centuries, which leans heavily to the jazz side". In his review of the album's sequel AllMusic's John Bush noted that,"... the LP practically disappeared upon release... but enjoyed a long shelf life among idiosyncratic jazz fans..."; so much so that the sequel was released 35 years after the original.

Track listing
All compositions by Lalo Schifrin
 "Old Laces" – 4:23
 "The Wig" – 2:44
 "The Blues for Johann Sebastian" – 3:38
 "Renaissance" – 3:29
 "Beneath a Weeping Willow Shade" – 2:33
 "Versailles Promenade" – 4:04
 "Troubadour" – 3:07
 "Marquis de Sade" – 2:50
 "Aria" – 2:36
 "Bossa Antique" – 3:29

Personnel
Lalo Schifrin – arranger, conductor, harpsichord, piano
Jerome Richardson – alto flute, bass flute, tenor saxophone
Romeo Penque – alto flute, tenor saxophone
Jimmy Maxwell, Ernie Royal, Clark Terry, Snooky Young – trumpet
Ray Alonge, Richard Berg, James Buffington – French horn
Urbie Green, J.J. Johnson, Kai Winding – trombone
Tommy Mitchell – bass trombone
Don Butterfield – tuba
Gene Bertoncini – classical guitar, electric guitar
Gloria Agostini – harp
Harry Lookofsky, Gene Orloff, Christopher Williams- violin
Alfred Brown – viola, violin
George Ricci – cello
Richard Davis – double bass
Grady Tate – drums
Rose Marie Jun – vocals

Production
Creed Taylor – producer
Rudy Van Gelder – recording engineer
Val Valentin – director of engineering
Acy Lehman – cover design
Paul De Barros – liner notes

References

Verve Records albums
Albums produced by Creed Taylor
Albums arranged by Lalo Schifrin
Lalo Schifrin albums
1966 albums
Albums recorded at Van Gelder Studio
Albums conducted by Lalo Schifrin